The Tommy Ivan Trophy was awarded annually to the player selected as the most valuable player in the Central Hockey League (CHL).

Named in honour of Tommy Ivan commencing with 1974–75 CHL season, this individual award recognized the player who distinguished himself for his “outstanding contributions to his team during the course of the regular season”. The winner was chosen through a vote of the CHL coaches.

List of winners

References

Central Professional Hockey League trophies and awards
Awards established in 1963
Awards disestablished in 1984
1963 establishments in the United States
1984 disestablishments in the United States